Field Methods is a peer-reviewed academic journal that publishes papers in the field of Social Sciences. The journal's editor is H. Russell Bernard (University of Florida). It has been in publication since 1989 and is currently published by SAGE Publications.

Scope  
Field Methods is a source of information for scholars, students and professionals alike. The journal publishes articles including descriptions of methodological advances, advice on the use of specific field techniques and help with both qualitative and quantitative methods. The journal also contains essays and book and software reviews.

Abstracting and indexing 
Field Methods is abstracted and indexed in, among other databases:  SCOPUS, and the Social Sciences Citation Index. According to the Journal Citation Reports, its 2017 impact factor is 1.471, ranking it 33 out of 98 journals in the category ‘Social Sciences, Interdisciplinary’. and 32 out of 85 journals in the category ‘Anthropology’.

References

External links 
 

SAGE Publishing academic journals
English-language journals